Jean-Marie-Joseph-Pantaléon Pelletier (July 27, 1860 – October 19, 1924) was a physician and political figure in Quebec. He represented Sherbrooke in the Legislative Assembly of Quebec from 1900 to 1911 as a Liberal. Francoeur was Speaker of the Legislative Assembly from 1909 to 1911.

Biography 
He was born in Rivière-Ouelle, Quebec, the son of Joseph Pelletier and Henriette Martin. Pelletier was educated at the Collège de Sainte-Anne-de-la-Pocatière and the Université Laval. He qualified as a physician in 1887 and, after interning in New York City and Paris, set up practice in Sherbrooke. Pelletier was surgeon at the Hôpital Sacré-Cœur and also served as coroner for Saint-François district. In 1897, he was named to the Quebec Board of Health. He was a lieutenant in the Canadian Militia with the 9th Battalion Volunteer Militia Rifles and served during the North-West Rebellion. He was later a captain and medical officer of the 11th Hussars in Richmond and later reaching the rank of lieutenant-colonel and first commanding officer of the newly raised 54th Regiment (Carabiniers de Sherbrooke). In 1888, he married Alice Hudon. Pelletier resigned his seat in the assembly in 1911 after he was named Quebec provincial representative in London. He died in Quebec City at the age of 64.

His uncle Charles Alphonse Pantaléon Pelletier served in the Canadian House of Commons and as Lieutenant-Governor of Quebec.

References

External links
 

Presidents of the National Assembly of Quebec
Quebec Liberal Party MNAs
1860 births
1924 deaths
People from Bas-Saint-Laurent
Canadian coroners
Université Laval alumni
Canadian Militia officers
Les Voltigeurs de Québec officers
Canadian military doctors
7th/11th Hussars officers